Mangelia ceroplasta is a species of sea snail, a marine gastropod mollusk in the family Mangeliidae.

Description
The length of the shell attains 5.5 mm.

Distribution
This marine species occurs off North Carolina, USA and Martinique.

References

 Bush, K. J. 1885. Additions to the shallow-water Mollusca of Cape Hatteras, N.C., dredged by the U.S. Fish Commission Steamer 'Albatross,' in 1883 and 1884 Transactions of the Connecticut Academy of Arts and Sciences 6 453–480, pl. 45.

External links
 *  Tucker, J.K. 2004 Catalog of recent and fossil turrids (Mollusca: Gastropoda). Zootaxa 682:1–1295.

ceroplasta
Gastropods described in 1885